Horst Paul August Ehmke (4 February 1927 – 12 March 2017) was a German lawyer, law professor and politician of the Social Democratic Party (SPD). He served as Federal Minister of Justice (1969), Chief of Staff at the German Chancellery and Federal Minister for Special Affairs (1969–1972) and Federal Minister for Research, Technology, and Post (1972–1974).

Life
Ehmke was born in the Free City of Danzig, where he passed his Abitur. In 1944, at the age of 17, Ehmke was enrolled as a member of the Nazi Party, although when this became public knowledge in 2007 as part of a media investigation of Nazi archives, he stated that he had made no application and was previously unaware of the enrollment. Following the Expulsion of Germans after World War II he came as a refugee to western Germany. He studied Law and Economics in Göttingen and Political science and History at Princeton University (U.S.) from 1949 to 1950. In 1952, he promoted as Dr. iur., and in 1956, he passed his final examinations. In these years, he was the assistant of Adolf Arndt, member of the Bundestag (SPD).

From 1956 to 1960, Ehmke became a member of the Ford Foundation in Cologne and Berkeley. After passing his Habilitation in 1960, he became Professor of public law at the University of Freiburg, where he became the Dean. From 1963 on, Ehmke was ordinary Professor and held the chair of Law at this university. Since 1974, he was accredited as a lawyer.

Ehmke was married and had three children.

Political career

Since 1947, Ehmke has been a member of the SPD, where he was a member of the executive board from 1973 to 1991. He was a member of the Bundestag from 1969 to 1994 for the state of North Rhine-Westphalia. Here, he was deputy whip of the SPD faction from 1977 to 1990.

Ehmke was Federal Minister of Justice from to March to October 1969 before becoming Chief of Staff at the German Chancellery from 1969 to 1972 under Chancellor Willy Brandt, being simultaneously the Federal Minister for Special Affairs. After the 1972 West German federal election he moved to become Federal Minister for Research, Technology and Post, until he was replaced in May 1974 by Hans Matthöfer. Ehmke died on 12 March 2017 at the age of 90.

Writings
 Grenzen der Verfassungsänderung, 1953
 Politik der praktischen Vernunft – Aufsätze und Referate, 1969
 Politik als Herausforderung. Reden – Vorträge – Aufsätze 1968–1974, 1974
 Politik als Herausforderung. Reden – Vorträge – Aufsätze 1975–1979, 1979
 Beiträge zur Verfassungstheorie und Verfassungspolitik, 1981
 Mittendrin – Von der Großen Koalition zur Deutschen Einheit, 1994
After retiring, Ehmke also wrote detective stories revolving around politics:
 Global Players, 1998
 Der Euro-Coup, 1999
 Himmelsfackeln, 2001
 Privatsache, 2003
 Im Schatten der Gewalt, 2006

References

External links

 Interview about the play Democracy 2005, on Broadway about Willy Brandt

1927 births
2017 deaths
Members of the Bundestag for North Rhine-Westphalia
Justice ministers of Germany
Politicians from Gdańsk
Sozialistischer Deutscher Studentenbund members
University of Göttingen alumni
Princeton University alumni
Academic staff of the University of Freiburg
Naturalized citizens of Germany
People from the Free City of Danzig
Heads of the German Chancellery
Members of the Bundestag for the Social Democratic Party of Germany
Nazi Party members